"Cry" is a song by American country music  singer Faith Hill. It was released as the first single from her fifth studio album of the same name (2002). The song was originally written and recorded by singer-songwriter Angie Aparo for his 1999 album, The American. In 2003, at the 45th Annual Grammy Awards, Hill won the Grammy Award for Best Female Country Vocal Performance for "Cry", marking her second win in the category.

Originally released to country radio on August 19, 2002, "Cry" crossed over to pop and adult contemporary radio in September 2002. It spent 11 weeks at number one on the US Billboard Adult Contemporary chart and eventually peaked at number 33 on the Billboard Hot 100 chart. "Cry" also reached number three on the Canadian Singles Chart and was a top-20 hit in Hungary, New Zealand, Norway, Romania, and Spain.

Chart performance
Released on August 19, 2002, "Cry" peaked at number 12 on the US Billboard Country Songs chart and number 33 on the Billboard Hot 100. The song achieved its highest peak on the Billboard Adult Contemporary chart, where it spent 11 weeks at number one.

Awards and accolades

|-
| 2003
| Grammy Award
| Best Female Country Vocal Performance
| 
|}

Track listings
US 7-inch single and UK cassette single
 "Cry" – 3:46
 "Wicked" – 4:02

UK, Australian, and Japanese CD single
 "Cry" – 3:46
 "Wicked" – 4:02
 "Shadows" – 4:29

Credits and personnel
Credits are lifted from the Cry album booklet.

Studios
 Recorded at Rumbo Recorders (Canoga Park, California), The Hit Factory (New York City), Oceanway (Nashville, Tennessee), and The Attic (Monrovia, California)
 Mixed at South Beach Studios (Miami, Florida)
 Mastered at The Mastering Lab (Hollywood, California)

Personnel

 Angie Aparo – writing
 Faith Hill – vocals, production
 Marti Frederiksen – background vocals, acoustic and electric guitar, percussion, Pro Tools editing
 Lisa Cochran – background vocals
 Damon Johnson – acoustic, electric, and slide guitar
 Leland Sklar – bass
 Jim Cox – piano, B3, string arrangement
 Eric Carter – keyboard programming
 Vinnie Colaiuta – drums
 Brian Paturalski – recording, Pro Tools editing
 Michael McCoy – additional vocal engineering
 Tom Lord-Alge – mixing
 Doug Sax – mastering
 Robert Hadley – mastering

Charts

Weekly charts

Year-end charts

Certifications

Release history

See also
 List of Billboard Adult Contemporary number ones of 2002 and 2003 (U.S.)

References

2002 singles
2002 songs
Country ballads
Faith Hill songs
Music videos directed by Mike Lipscombe
Songs written by Angie Aparo
Warner Records Nashville singles